Hyrum is a city in Cache County, Utah, United States. The population was 7,609 at the 2010 census, with an estimated population of 8,403 in 2018. It is included in the Logan, Utah–Idaho (partial) Metropolitan Statistical Area.

Geography
Hyrum is located near the southern end of the Cache Valley at  (41.6341, -111.8522). It is bordered to the southwest by Hyrum Reservoir.

Climate
This climatic region is typified by large seasonal temperature differences, with warm to hot (and often humid) summers and cold (sometimes severely cold) winters.  According to the Köppen Climate Classification system, Hyrum has a humid continental climate, abbreviated "Dfb" on climate maps.

History
Hyrum was founded in 1860 by a group of 23 families, mainly either Danish immigrants or sons of Ezra T. Benson. Benson organized an LDS ward there in May 1860. The town got a post office in 1861. By 1900 the population had grown to the point that the ward was divided in three. Hyrum had 1,869 inhabitants in 1930.

Points of interest

Hyrum State Park
Hyrum, Utah is the home of Hyrum State Park which is located on Hyrum Reservoir and is popular for fishing, water skiing, swimming, and camping.

Hyrum State Park offers many recreational opportunities including fishing, boating, and camping. Surrounded by tall, shady trees, Hyrum Reservoir provides an excellent place for an afternoon picnic, or to spend the weekend trolling on the lake catching yellow perch, rainbow trout, bluegill, and largemouth bass.

Hyrum State Park offers live camera views that can be seen online.

Hardware Ranch
Herds of elk spend the winter months at Hardware Ranch, which is reached by travelling east from Hyrum up Blacksmith Fork Canyon. The ranch is part of a wildlife management area, and sleigh rides are offered that take visitors into the herd.

Demographics

As of the census of 2000, there were 6,316 people, 1,683 households, and 1,497 families residing in the city. The racial makeup of the city was 88.58% White, 0.19% African American, 0.74% Native American, 0.17% Asian, 0.19% Pacific Islander, 8.36% from other races, and 1.76% from two or more races. 13.47% of the population were Hispanic or Latino of any race.

The population was 7,609 at the 2010 census, with a projected population of 8,812 in 2017.

There were 1,683 households, out of which 59.7% had children under the age of 18 living with them, 76.8% were married couples living together, 9.2% had a female householder with no husband present, and 11.0% were non-families. 9.0% of all households were made up of individuals, and 3.6% had someone living alone who was 65 years of age or older. The average household size was 3.75 and the average family size was 4.00.

In the city, the population was spread out, with 40.4% under the age of 18, 11.6% from 18 to 24, 27.6% from 25 to 44, 15.2% from 45 to 64, and 5.2% who were 65 years of age or older. The median age was 24 years. For every 100 females there were 103.5 males. For every 100 females age 18 and over, there were 100.2 males.

The median income for a household in the city was $43,981, and the median income for a family was $44,915. Males had a median income of $31,989 versus $20,770 for females. The per capita income for the city was $14,845. 6.5% of the population and 5.2% of families were below the poverty line. Out of the total population, 8.5% of those under the age of 18 and 3.7% of those 65 and older were living below the poverty line.

Hyrum in the news
On December 12, 2006, U.S. Immigration and Customs Enforcement (I.C.E) staged a coordinated predawn raid at E.A. Miller, a meat packing plant in Hyrum, and at five other Swift & Company plants located in the western United States, interviewing workers and hauling off hundreds in buses.

On December 30, 2017, an elementary-school art teacher was reprimanded, and eventually terminated, after showing classical nude images in the classroom setting. The images were from materials provided by the school.

See also

 List of cities and towns in Utah

References

External links

 

Cities in Cache County, Utah
Cities in Utah
Logan metropolitan area
Populated places established in 1860